Hugo Camacho Galván (born 23 September 1959) is a Mexican politician from the National Action Party. From 2000 to 2003 he served as Deputy of the LVIII Legislature of the Mexican Congress representing Nuevo León.

References

1959 births
Living people
Politicians from Durango
People from Gómez Palacio, Durango
National Action Party (Mexico) politicians
21st-century Mexican politicians
Autonomous University of Coahuila alumni
Deputies of the LVIII Legislature of Mexico
Members of the Chamber of Deputies (Mexico) for Nuevo León